Adrian Albert D'souza (born 24 March 1984  in Mumbai, Maharashtra) is an Indian field hockey goalkeeper, who made his international debut for the men's national team in January 2004 during the Sultan Azlan Shah Hockey Tournament in Kuala Lumpur, Malaysia. Adrian has more than 100 International Caps for his country in all competitions. He has played in all major field hockey tournaments, including the 2006 Hockey World Cup, 2006 Asian Games, 2007 Asia Cup and 2 Champions Trophies. Regarded as one of the most innovative and daring goal-keepers of recent times, Adrian brought the rushing technique to the hockey field. Adrian has competed in 3/4 major international hockey events (tournaments played once in four years): the Olympics, World Cup, and Asian Games with a total of 165 caps for his country.

Early life and education 
Adrian attended the St. Anne's School in Mumbai till grade 10. After completing grade 12 from Khalsa Junior College, Mumbai, he went on to earn a bachelor's degree in sociology from Rizvi College, Mumbai. While active in sports, he was also a good football player. At 17 Adrian got selected for the prestigious Air India Hockey Academy in New Delhi.

Career 
Adrian's introduction to hockey happened by coincidence at the age of 9. The regular goal-keeper of his school team did not report for a game and Adrian agreed to play as a replacement. He had a broken tooth by the end of the match and promised never to play keeper again. But his coach was impressed and Adrian has never looked back since. Adrian has played 165 international matches for his country. Adrian was one of the youngest hockey players to play at the Olympics at the age of 20.

Domestic clubs
His first domestic hockey club was Mumbai Customs in 2001. In 2002 he got selected to play for Air India which got him the best goalkeeper award in The Bombay Gold Cup and was called for his first Senior Hockey National Camp. Adrian Joined B.P.C.L in 2003 and Indian Airlines in 2005 which is now Air India (present) .

International
Total Caps - 165

Adrian was awarded the best goal-keeper award while being a part of the Junior India team that participated in the 6th Nation Junior Champions Challenge at Gniezno, Poland in 2003. He made his international debut as a senior in the Sultan Azlan Shah Cup in Kuala Lumpur in January 2004. His performance in the Junior Asia Cup in April, that India won, earned him the best goalkeeper award. This was followed by four-nation tournaments in Japan, The Netherlands and Germany. He represented India at the 2004 Athens Olympics, which saw India end in the 7th position. In the 8 match test series between India and Pakistan played in October 2004, he was awarded the best goalkeeper for the Pakistan leg (4 matches), while also being adjourned the best player of the series.

D'Souza was captain of the Indian team in the 2005 Junior Hockey World Cup. The same year he was part of the junior team in the 6 nation invitational tournament in Kuala Lumpur, Malaysia. 2006 was a busy year for the Indian team with major tournaments lined up and the selectors expected Adrian to play a pivotal role in the team. The year saw him represent the team in the Sultan Azlan Shah tournament (Malaysia) in June, the Champions Trophy (Spain) in July, the World Cup (Germany) in September, and ending with the Asian Games (Qatar) in December, while missing the Commonwealth Games in Australia due to an injury. In 2007, he was part of the bronze-winning team in the Champions Challenge in Belgium and the gold winning team at the Asia Cup. Due to a hamstring injury, Adrian had to pull out from the 2008 Olympic Qualifier camp. India could not beat Great Britain in the final and missed the Olympics for the first time in 80 years. Adrian, along with his parents, watched the game in Mumbai. He was back after a break of 2 months and was selected for the 2 legged 4 Nation tournament in Perth and Darwin. The tournament also included hosts Australia, China and South Korea. Adrian performed relatively well in the 2008 Sultan Azlan Shah Cup, having played a great game against Malaysia in the semi-finals. India scored from a penalty corner and Malaysia could not prevent India from making it to the final of the Sultan Azlan Shah after 13 long years. Facing a tightly contested match against Argentina in the finals, India lost in the extra time. Adrian played his last international tournament, the Sultan Azlan Shah Cup in 2012.

Franchise leagues
Adrian D'Souza plays in the Premier Hockey League for the Maratha Warriors. He participated in the inaugural Super League organized by the Pakistan Hockey Federation. representing the Baloch Lions and was awarded the 2nd Best goal-keeper award. Adrian then took part in his first stint for an international club. Adrian played for Koln Club in Germany. Adrian went on the play World Series Hockey for Mumbai Marines. In the Hockey India League Adrian played for his hometown city club Dabang Mumbai.

Awards and nominations
Was nominated for the prize of the World's Most Promising Young player Award for the year 2004 by the FIH.
Was awarded India's "Player of the Year" for the year 2004 by the Indian Hockey Year Book.
Was awarded the HISA (Hero Indian Sports Academy) award for best Indian Hockey player of the year for 2004.
 Was awarded the prestigious Chattrapati Shivaji State Award in 2006.

Personal life 

Adrian's jersey number is 12, which he considers lucky. He gets his helmets custom made by OBO while designing the graphics himself. Adrian has the Olympic rings tattooed on his torso.

References

External links
 
 Bharatiya Hockey

1984 births
Living people
Field hockey players from Mumbai
Field hockey players at the 2004 Summer Olympics
Indian Roman Catholics
Olympic field hockey players of India
World Series Hockey players
Field hockey players at the 2006 Asian Games
Indian male field hockey players
Asian Games competitors for India
2006 Men's Hockey World Cup players
2010 Men's Hockey World Cup players